Eremophila pallida is a flowering plant in the figwort family, Scrophulariaceae and is endemic to Western Australia. It is a small, spreading shrub with hairy stems, leaves with a few serrations and reddish purple to violet flowers.

Description
The branches are straw-coloured at first, age to whitish-yellow, are covered with a mixture of glandular and simple hairs and are often sticky near their ends due to the presence of resin.

The petal tube is purple to reddish-purple, white with dark lilac-purple blotches inside. The outer surface of the lobes and the upper part of the outside of the tube are covered with glandular hairs but the lower part of the outside is glabrous. The inner surface of the petal lobes is also glabrous but the inside of the tube is filled with long hairs. The 4 stamens are fully enclosed in the petal tube.

Taxonomy and naming 
The species was first formally described by Robert Chinnock in 2007 and the description was published in Eremophila and Allied Genera: A Monograph of the Plant Family Myoporaceae. The specific epithet (pallida) is a Latin word meaning "ashen" or "wan", referring to the very pale young branches of this species.

Distribution and habitat
Eremophila pallida occurs north-west of Warburton in the Central Ranges and Gibson Desert biogeographic regions where it grows in red lateritic soils often with a gibber surface.

Conservation status
This species is classified as "Priority Two" by the Western Australian Government Department of Parks and Wildlife meaning that is poorly known and from only one or a few locations.

References

Eudicots of Western Australia
pallida
Endemic flora of Western Australia
Plants described in 2007
Taxa named by Robert Chinnock